The Musée de Minéralogie is a museum of mineralogy operated by the École nationale supérieure des mines de Paris (Mines ParisTech). It is located in the 6th arrondissement at 60, boulevard Saint Michel, Paris, France, and open daily except Sunday and Monday; an admission fee is charged.

The school was established in 1783, and the museum itself in 1794 under René Just Haüy as a Cabinet of Mineralogy "containing all production in the world and all productions of the Republic, arranged by locality." It was quickly augmented by private collections, sometimes seized by the state. Many fine additions were made in short order, and by 1814 the museum contained about 100,000 samples at the Hotel de Mouchy. During the 19th century and early 20th century it continued to acquire excellent collections from around the world, interrupted for several decades by World War II, but then resuming. 

Today the museum is stated to be one of the ten largest mineral collections in the world, containing some 100,000 samples including 80,000 minerals, 15,000 rocks, 4,000 ores, 400 meteorites, 700 gems, and 300 artificial crystals.

See also 
 List of museums in Paris
 Musée de Minéralogie – official site
 Musée de Minéralogie
 Paris.org entry
 Paris.fr entry (French)

References 

Museums in Paris
Geology museums in France
Buildings and structures in the 6th arrondissement of Paris
Mineralogy museums